KTSN (1340 AM) was a radio station broadcasting a talk radio format. Licensed to Elko, Nevada, United States, the station was owned by Northern Nevada Media, Inc.

Northern Nevada Media surrendered KTSN's license to the Federal Communications Commission (FCC) on April 6, 2015; the FCC cancelled the license on April 9, 2015.

References

External links

TSN
Radio stations established in 1998
Talk radio stations in the United States
ESPN Radio stations
Elko, Nevada
1998 establishments in Nevada
CBS Sports Radio stations
Defunct radio stations in the United States
Radio stations disestablished in 2015
2015 disestablishments in Nevada
TSN